Sanjevani is a major Kannada afternoon newspaper has its headquarters in Bangalore, Karnataka. It was started on 10 December 1982, thus completing 25 years in 2007. Sanjevani was the first South Indian language newspaper to be put onto the World Wide Web in the year 1998, and was chosen "No. 1 Kannada Newspaper" by a Microsoft survey in 2001.
As of 2010, Sanjevani is published in 10 different centers in the state (Bangalore, Mangalore, Hubli, Gulbarga, Bellary, Raichur, Mysore, Davengere, Tumkur and Shimoga), becoming the first Kannada daily to do so. In April 2010, a mobile version of their website was launched.

See also
 List of Kannada-language newspapers
 List of Kannada-language magazines
 List of newspapers in India
 Media in Karnataka
 Media of India

References

External links 
  

Newspapers published in Bangalore
Kannada-language newspapers
1982 establishments in Karnataka
Publications established in 1982